Math, Science, and Technology Preparatory School is a magnet middle/high school located in the City of Buffalo, New York. the first preparatory school in Western New York and the third in New York State. The school opened in September 2006 and has approximately 387 students. The current principal is Dr. Kevin Eberle, and the current assistant principals are Ms. Sarah Cosgrove and Ms. Danielle Womack.

Academics 
MSTP (Math Science and Technology Preparatory School) enrolls students from 9th through 12th grade. MSTP is a public school in the Buffalo Public School district, and is part of the school district's school choice program. Accelerated programs begin in fifth grade, and by 12th grade all students are expected to have passed at least two AP classes. MSTP had its first graduating class in 2010.  100% of 2010 graduates were accepted into college.

The Funding 
The school is funded by the Bill & Melinda Gates Foundation and The Michael & Susan Dell Foundation who gave around half a million dollars.  MSTP is a College Board school, and all of its faculty and staff have been through extensive training through college board.

History 

The school opened in 2006 in a building that formerly housed Seneca Vocational High School. It is a College Board school that began accepting students and sixth and ninth grade and since added two grades each year.

The Seneca campus was renovated from 2010 until 2012. During this time, the school was temporarily located at the site of former Public School 51 Black Rock Academy while renovations were made to the Seneca building. The Seneca building reopened in Fall 2012.

In Fall 2016, Grades 5 through 8 moved to the former Dr. Martin Luther King Multicultural Institute at 487 High Street. The MST building also housed the new Research Laboratory High School for the 2016–2017 school year.

Former principals 
Previous assignment and reason for departure denoted in parentheses
Ms. Pamela D. Rutland–2006-2008 (Principal - Community School 53, named Principal of Wilson Magnet High School)
Ms. Rose M. Schneider–2008-2014 (Assistant Principal - Hutchinson Central Technical High School, assigned to East High School)
Mr. Todd B. Miklas–2014-2017 (Principal - Lorraine Elementary School, named Principal of Gowanda Middle School)
Mr. Derek M. Baker–2017-2018 (Assistant Principal - Math, Science, Technology Preparatory School, named Principal of Sweet Home Middle School)

Former assistant principals 
Previous assignment and reason for departure denoted in parentheses
Mrs. Aarin R. Pellitieri–2007-2010 (Fourth grade teacher - Hamlin Park School, named Assistant Principal at Riverside Institute of Technology)
Ms. Denise B. McMichael-Houston–2010-2015 (Assistant Principal - Dr. Charles R. Drew Science Magnet School, retired)
Ms. Tracy E. Simchick–2014-2015 (Staff Developer - Erie 2 Chattaqua BOCES, named Director of Curriculum at Global Concepts Charter School)
Mr. Darryl A. King–2015-2016 (Assistant Principal - Dr. Martin Luther King, Jr. Multicultural Institute, named Principal of East Community High School)
Mr. Andrew M. Drouin–2015-2016 (Assistant Principal - Lorraine Elementary, named Assistant Principal of BUILD Academy)
Mr. Dennis M. Lesniak–2016-2017 (Assistant Principal - Harvey Austin School, named Assistant Principal of Hutchinson Central Technical High School)
Mr. Donald R. White–2017-2018 (Assistant Principal - Community School 53, placed on medical leave)
Ms. Tatiana Merrick–2017-2020 (Biology teacher- McKinley Vocational High School, named Director of Science for Buffalo Public Schools)

Former administrators

School 196 @ 39 Annex 

MST Prep 196 @ 39 is a junior high school annex located at the former School 39 on High Street on the East Side of Buffalo. It opened in 2016 to better accommodate the needs of younger students. The school houses Grades 5–8. The current principal is Mrs. Bethany Schill-Brown and the current Acting Assistant Principal is Ms. Brittany Mecca.

Former principal 
Previous assignment and reason for departure denoted in parentheses
Mr. Michael J. Mogavero–2018-2019 (Principal - Lafayette High School, placed on assignment)

Former assistant principals 
Previous assignment and reason for departure denoted in parentheses
Mr. Derek Baker–2016-2017 (Assistant Principal - North Park Middle Academy, named Interim Principal of Math, Science, Technology Preparatory School)
Mr. Terence Jenkins–2017-2018 (Assistant Principal - Waterfront Elementary School, named Interim Principal of Waterfront Elementary School)
Mr. John Paul Zeis–2017-2019 (Dean of Students - Math, Science, Technology Preparatory School, named Assistant Principal of Discovery School)
Ms. Brittany L. Mecca

References

External links
PS 197 Math Science Technology Preparatory School

High schools in New York (state)
Public high schools in New York (state)
Schools in Buffalo, New York
Schools in Erie County, New York
Public middle schools in New York (state)